Father, Dear Father is a 1973 British comedy film based on the popular Thames Television sitcom of the same name Father, Dear Father and directed by William G. Stewart.

The story is based on episodes from seasons 1 and 2.

Plot
Patrick feels his daughters need a mother so he decides to marry his agent Georgie (Jill Melford), only then mistakenly to propose to the cleaning lady (Beryl Reid).

Cast
Some of the cast is different from the television series:
Patrick Cargill - Patrick Glover
Noel Dyson - Nanny
Natasha Pyne - Anna
Ann Holloway - Karen
Ursula Howells - Barbara (Patrick's Ex Wife)
Jack Watling - Bill (her husband)
Donald Sinden - Phillip (Patrick's brother)
Jill Melford - Georgie Thompson (his agent)
Beryl Reid - Mrs Stoppard (Georgie's cleaning woman)
Joseph O'Conor - Vicar
Richard O'Sullivan - Richard (Anna's boyfriend)
Joyce Carey - Patrick's Mother
Elizabeth Adare - Maggie
Clifton Jones - Larry (her husband)
Jo-Jo the dog - H.G.Wells

Critical reception
Sky Movies called it a "so-so comedy film version of the successful TV sitcom."

External links

References

1973 films
1973 comedy films
British comedy films
Films shot at EMI-Elstree Studios
Films based on television series
1970s English-language films
1970s British films